Eugene Francis Pepper (September 22, 1927 – January 16, 2006) was an American football offensive and defensive lineman in the National Football League (NFL) for the Washington Redskins and the Baltimore Colts.  He played college football at the University of Missouri and was drafted in the sixth round of the 1950 NFL Draft.

1927 births
2006 deaths
American football defensive tackles
American football offensive guards
American football offensive tackles
Baltimore Colts players
Missouri Tigers football players
People from St. Louis County, Missouri
Washington Redskins players